1932 Országos Bajnokság I (men's water polo) was the 26th water polo championship in Hungary. There were nine teams whose divided into two groups because of the Olympics. Group A played for the championship, here were five teams who played one-round match for the title. Group B played avoid relegation, here were four teams who played two-round match. At the end of the regular season the Group A 5th place team and the Group B 1st team played placement match for fifth place.

Final list

Group A 

* M: Matches W: Win D: Drawn L: Lost G+: Goals earned G-: Goals got P: Point

Group B

Placement match 
Fifth place game: MOVE Eger SE–Szegedi UE 4:2

Sources 
Gyarmati Dezső: Aranykor (Hérodotosz Könyvkiadó és Értékesítő Bt., Budapest, 2002.)
Magyar Sport Almanach 1931-1934

1932 in water polo
1932 in Hungarian sport
Seasons in Hungarian water polo competitions